Clinical Pharmacokinetics is a peer-reviewed medical journal published by Adis International (Springer Nature) that covers topics related to pharmacokinetics. According to the Journal Citation Reports, the journal has a 2021 Impact Factor™ of 5.577 ranked 62 of 279 journals in the Pharmacology & Pharmacy category [Clarivate Analytics]; 2021 CiteScore™ of 10.3 ranked 15 of 255 journals in the Pharmacology [Medical] category [Scopus])

References

External links 
 

Pharmacology journals
English-language journals
Publications established in 1976
Springer Science+Business Media academic journals
Monthly journals